Infinifilm, first introduced in 2001, was New Line Cinema's brand of specialized DVDs containing a feature to notify viewers of special features on the disc applicable to the scene currently playing, such as interviews, behind-the-scenes footage or deleted scenes. If the user chose to watch one of these special features, the movie would be paused and the special feature would then be played. After that, the user would be returned to the point in the movie where they left off.

The last Infinifilm DVD release was The Number 23 in 2007. Many of the label's films that New Line ported to Blu-ray featuring the original Infinifilm content were rebranded as "Focus Points." New Line then abandoned Infinifilm, most likely due to the 2008 absorption by Warner Bros.

Warner Bros. Discovery brands
Home video lines
Audiovisual introductions in 2001